The  (CERO) is a Japanese entertainment rating organization based in Tokyo that rates video game content in console games with levels of ratings that informs the customer(s) of the nature of the product and what age group it is suitable for. It was established in June 2002 as a branch of Computer Entertainment Supplier's Association, and became an officially recognized nonprofit organization under Japanese law in December 2003.

CERO rating marks 
On March 1, 2006, CERO implemented the latest revision of its rating system. The symbols that CERO uses are stylized Latin letters, named after academic grading, except "F" is replaced with "Z". Each is meant to convey a game's suitability for minors. "CERO rating marks" are grouped broadly into "age classification marks" and "other marks". Age classification marks include the following five marks. One of the marks is indicated on the left bottom of the game box front, and a corresponding color bar is also shown on the box spine. (Bar colors: black for "A"; green for "B"; blue for "C"; orange for "D"; red for "Z")

Content icons 
In April 2004, CERO defined the following "content icons". Content icons represent that the age classification decision has been made based on the expressions belonging to one (or more) of the content icons. They are grouped into nine categories. These icons are displayed on the back of all game boxes except on those rated "A" or "Educational/Database".

Rating process 

According to Kazuya Watanabe, CERO's senior director, the group of assessors is composed of five regular people unaffiliated with the game industry. They are trained by rating past games. The rating process is determined by 30 different expressions, each with an upper limit. The expressions that exceed the upper limit are designated as "banned expressions". In addition, six expressions are not allowed and are also considered to be banned expressions. The expressions are categorized into four different types: "Sex-related expression type" (Love, Sexual Content), "Violence expression type" (Violence, Horror), "Antisocial act expression type" (Drinking/Smoking, Gambling, Crime, Drugs), and "Language and ideology-related expression type" (Language). Each expression is rated using the A to Z scale that the rating marks use. After the group evaluates the game, the results are sent to CERO's main office where the final rating attempts to use the majority of the evaluators' ratings.

Scandals, controversies, and criticisms 

One month after the initial release of Atelier Meruru: The Apprentice of Arland, shipments of it were halted due to it having been mis-rated. It was re-released a few days later with a B rating from CERO. Its A (All Ages) rating was revoked and it was given a B (Ages 12+) rating instead, due to some suggestive themes featured in the game. The game was originally rated for all ages due to Gust allegedly not providing them with the complete content of the game for them to review.

CERO has been criticized for being stricter on content in games when compared to other rating boards, a 2020 example being The Last of Us Part II. Despite receiving a Z (Ages 18+ only) rating, which is the maximum rating a game could receive from CERO, it was still censored with an example being the game's sexual content, where a sex scene that is featured in the game was censored. In the Japanese version, the scene cuts out just a short time after both characters begin kissing, removing the nudity seen in other versions of the game. The game also received some censorship of its violence, as some of the gore and dismemberment seen in the game was removed in the Japanese version.

The Callisto Protocols Japanese release was canceled when the game did not receive a CERO rating due to the game's violent content, and the developer refused to make any necessary changes.

References

External links 
 

Video game organizations
Video game content ratings systems
Entertainment rating organizations
Video gaming in Japan
2002 establishments in Japan
Organizations established in 2002
Censorship in Japan
Mass media companies